Donna Edna Shalala (born February 14, 1941) is an American politician and academic who served in the Carter and Clinton administrations, as well as in the U.S. House of Representatives from 2019 to 2021. Shalala is a recipient of the Presidential Medal of Freedom, which she was awarded in 2008.

Shalala earned a bachelor's degree from Western College for Women in 1962 and served in the Peace Corps. In 1970, she earned a PhD from the Maxwell School of Citizenship and Public Affairs. Shalala later worked as a professor at Baruch College and at Teachers College, Columbia University and was appointed as assistant secretary for policy development and research at the U.S. Department of Housing and Urban Development by President Jimmy Carter. Shalala became the president of Hunter College in 1980, serving until 1988 when she became chancellor of the University of Wisconsin–Madison.

From 1993 to 2001, Shalala served as the 18th United States Secretary of Health and Human Services under President Bill Clinton. Shalala served as HHS secretary for all eight years of the Clinton administration, becoming the nation's longest-serving HHS secretary. She is the first Lebanese-American to serve in a Cabinet position. Shalala served as president of the University of Miami from 2001 through 2015, and also taught at the university during that period. She was president of the Clinton Foundation from 2015 to 2017.

She served one term in the House before being defeated in the 2020 election by María Elvira Salazar in an upset.

Early life and education 
Shalala was born in Cleveland, Ohio, of Maronite Catholic Lebanese descent. Her father sold real estate; and her mother, one of the first Lebanese-Americans to graduate from Ohio State University, was a teacher who worked two jobs and attended law school at night. She has a twin sister, Diane Fritel.

Shalala attended West Technical High School where she was the editor of the school newspaper. She received a bachelor's degree in 1962 from Western College for Women. From 1962 to 1964, she was among the first volunteers to serve in the Peace Corps. Her placement took her to Iran where she worked with other volunteers to construct an agricultural college. In 1970, she earned a Ph.D. from the Maxwell School of Citizenship and Public Affairs at Syracuse University in Syracuse, New York.

Academic career (1970–1992) 
Shalala began her teaching career as a political science professor at Baruch College (part of the City University of New York), where she also was a member of the American Federation of Teachers union. In 1972, Shalala became a professor of politics and education at Teachers College, Columbia University, a post she held until 1979. Shalala became the only woman on the Municipal Assistance Corporation, a group tasked with saving the city during the 1975 New York City fiscal crisis. Concurrently, from 1977 to 1980, she served as the assistant secretary for policy development and research at the U.S. Department of Housing and Urban Development during the Carter Administration.

Shalala's first experience with academic administration came on October 8, 1980, when she became the tenth president of Hunter College, serving in this capacity until 1988.

Shalala next served as chancellor of the University of Wisconsin–Madison (1988–1993). At the time of her chancellorship, the university included 42,000 students, employed 16,500 people, and had an annual budget of $1 billion. She was the first woman to lead a Big Ten Conference school, and only the second woman in the country to head a major research university.

Under Shalala's chancellorship and with her support, the university adopted a broad speech code subjecting students to disciplinary action for communications that were perceived as hate speech. That speech code was later found unconstitutional by a federal judge. Also while chancellor, Shalala supported passage of a revised faculty speech code broadly restricting "harmful" speech in both "noninstructional" and "instructional" settings. The faculty speech code was abolished ten years later, after a number of professors were investigated for alleged or suspected violations. As Madison chancellor, Shalala, with then athletic director Pat Richter, interviewed and hired football coach Barry Alvarez who went on to become Wisconsin's all-time leader in football wins, with four appearances by Wisconsin in the Rose Bowl (including once as an interim coach).

U.S. Secretary of Health and Human Services (1993–2001) 

Following a year serving as chair of the Children's Defense Fund (1992–1993), Shalala was nominated in 1992 by President-elect Bill Clinton for the position of United States Secretary of Health and Human Services. The Washington Post labeled her "one of the most controversial Clinton Cabinet nominees". Her nomination went before the Senate Finance Committee in January 1993, and the Senate voted to confirm her on January 22, 1993. At the start of Shalala's tenure, the Department of Health and Human Services employed 125,000 people and had a budget of $539 billion.

Shalala served as HHS secretary for eight years during the Clinton administration, becoming the nation's longest-serving HHS secretary. In 1996, Shalala was the designated survivor during Clinton's State of the Union address. She is the first Lebanese-American to serve in a cabinet position.

Corporate boards (2001–2012) 
In 2001, Shalala joined the boards of UnitedHealth and Lennar, where over the following decade she earned millions of dollars. Shalala was paid almost a half-million dollars in 2010 to serve on the boards of three companies, two of which were run by UM trustees.

When she left Lennar in 2012, the company reported it was to avoid a "conflict of interest." Lennar's CEO, Stuart Miller, had joined the UM Board of Trustees in 2002. Shalala rejoined Lennar in 2017 after she was no longer President of the University. And she has been member of the advisory board of the Peter G. Peterson Foundation.

University of Miami presidency (2001–2015) 

In 2001, Shalala became president of the University of Miami. She created a University of Miami fundraising campaign called "Momentum," designed to raise the university's endowment from approximately $750 million to $1 billion; the goal was later increased to $1.25 billion by the end of 2007.

In 2013, the University of Miami sold 88 acres of undeveloped Pine Rocklands, one of the last remnants of the imperiled habitat in Miami-Dade County outside of Everglades National Park, to Ram Realty Services, for $22 million. The Miami New Times described this amount as "a complete steal for the developer in light of the relative worth of nearby property." Also in 2013, Ram Realty and Lennar Corp worked on at least one project together in North Carolina. When Shalala ran for the U.S. Congress in 2018, her candidacy was opposed by local environmentalists for her part in the sale of the University of Miami pine rocklands site.

Shalala faced some criticism for her response to a nationally publicized custodial workers' strike at the University of Miami, which lasted from February 28, 2006, until May 1, 2006. Critics called the University of Miami's custodial workers among the lowest paid university-based custodians in the nation and alleged they were not earning a living wage. The strike prompted Shalala to raise wages. Shalala was also criticized for living in luxury while the custodians did not have health insurance. Shalala criticized union organizer's tactics, including a sit-in that she said prevented students from attending classes.

On September 8, 2014, Shalala announced that she would be stepping down at the end of the 2014–2015 academic year.

Clinton Foundation (2015–2017) 
In 2015, Shalala took a leave of absence from her tenured professorship at the University of Miami to volunteer for the Clinton Foundation. She followed her tenure as president of the University of Miami by being named chief executive officer of the Foundation, serving in that capacity from 2015 to 2017.

According to The New York Times, Chelsea Clinton helped persuade Shalala to leave the University of Miami, move to New York and head the foundation. Shalala maintained a home in Miami and taught part-time at UM while heading the foundation in New York.

Shalala led the Clinton Foundation during the 2016 presidential election, in which Hillary Clinton was a leading candidate and the propriety of the foundation's activity came under scrutiny. In a September 14, 2016, interview on MSNBC, Shalala admitted that there was “no question” that donors to the Clinton Foundation had been given “courtesy appointments” in the State Department while Hillary Clinton ran that department. Shalala oversaw the termination of the Clinton Global Initiative during her tenure as CEO, as well as other reductions in operations intended to avoid conflicts of interest if Clinton won the election. She resisted calls by The Washington Post and USA Today to shut down the foundation entirely, arguing that "there are human beings around the world who would be affected by these decisions."

Shalala left the Clinton Foundation in April 2017 to return to her full-time teaching position at the University of Miami, replacing her former HHS deputy Kevin Thurm.

2015 stroke 
Following a September 2015 Clinton Global Initiative event held at the Sheraton New York hotel, Shalala fell ill. It was subsequently reported in a Clinton Foundation statement that she had suffered a stroke. In early 2018, she said she had recovered.

U.S. House of Representatives (2019–2021)

Elections

2018 

In March 2018, Shalala declared her candidacy in the Democratic primary for Florida's 27th congressional district. The district included just over half of Miami as well as some of its eastern suburbs. The district voted for Clinton by a comfortable margin in the 2016 presidential election, but its House seat was held by 30-year incumbent Republican Ileana Ros-Lehtinen, who had announced that she would retire at the conclusion of her term.

In an interview with WFOR-TV, Shalala stated that she supported universal healthcare coverage, but opposed a Medicare For All single-payer healthcare system because she believed that individuals who liked their current employment-based healthcare plans should be able to keep them. On August 28, 2018, Shalala won the Democratic five-candidate primary over state Representative David Richardson. The outcome of the race was substantially closer than polling predicted, which had her leading consistently by double digits. She won with 31.9 percent of the vote, vs. 27.5% for Richardson.

Shalala ran against Republican candidate María Elvira Salazar, an anchorwoman for Miami Telemundo outlet WSCV, in the general election. Shalala's campaign emphasized her experience and sought to tie Salazar to President Donald Trump, who was unpopular in the district. The race proved closer than expected, in part because Shalala does not speak Spanish; the 27th district is over 63 percent Latino. As late as a month before the election, polls showed Shalala either behind or practically tied with Salazar. However, Shalala won the election at the age of 77, making her the second-oldest freshman Representative in history after James B. Bowler who was elected at the age of 78 in 1953.

Shalala was sworn in as a member of the 116th United States Congress on January 3, 2019.

2020 

In the 2020 general election, Shalala ran against Republican Salazar again. On November 3, 2020, Shalala was defeated by Salazar. Salazar received 51.4% (176,141 votes) of the vote to Shalala's 48.6% (166,758 votes).

Tenure 
On December 18, 2019, Shalala voted to impeach President Donald Trump.

On April 17, 2020, Shalala was appointed by House Speaker Nancy Pelosi to serve on the COVID-19 Congressional Oversight Commission to oversee the implementation of the CARES Act. The appointment was met with criticism; the Miami Herald reported that Shalala had violated the STOCK Act by failing to disclose more than 500 stock trades, but Shalala remained on the commission and paid a $1,200 fine to the United States House Committee on Ethics.

On September 28, 2020, The Miami Herald reported that Shalala failed to publicly report two additional stock trades in violation of the STOCK Act disclosure rules.

Shalala was named a vice-chair of the 2020 Democratic National Convention.

Committee assignments 
Committee on Education and Labor
Subcommittee on Early Childhood, Elementary and Secondary Education
United States House Education Subcommittee on Health, Employment, Labor, and Pensions
Committee on Rules

Caucus memberships 
Congressional LGBT Equality Caucus
Congressional Solar Caucus

Other activities

Board memberships 
Shalala served on the board of directors of the United States Soccer Federation. Shalala served as a member of the board of directors of Lennar. She served on the board of directors of Gannett Company from 2001 to 2011, retiring because of age limits.

The Chronicle of Higher Education has reported on a potential conflict of interest involving Shalala's service on the boards of property development companies.

Civic activities 
In 1985, Shalala became a founding member of EMILY's List, a political action committee that seeks to elect pro-choice Democratic women to office. Shalala served from 2001–2007 on the board of the Albert Shanker Institute, a small, three-member staff organization named for the former head of the American Federation of Teachers. She is an honorary board member of the American Iranian Council, an organization that seeks to improve Iran–United States relations.

Shalala serves as a co-leader of the Nutrition and Physical Activity Initiative at the Bipartisan Policy Center. She serves as a distinguished senior fellow in the Economic Studies Program and the Engelberg Center for Health Care Reform at the Brookings Institution. She is also a member of Inter-American Dialogue, a Washington D.C.-based think tank.

Shalala also served as a panelist on the Blue Ribbon Study Panel on Biodefense, a working group of former high-ranking government officials and academic experts that put together a set of recommendations regarding the United States' defense capabilities against biological threats.

Honors 
At the University of Miami, Shalala was inducted the Iron Arrow Honor Society, the highest honor bestowed by the University of Miami. In 2002, she was inducted into Omicron Delta Kappa.

On June 19, 2008, Shalala was awarded the Presidential Medal of Freedom by President George W. Bush. In 2010, she received the Nelson Mandela Award for Health and Human Rights. She was inducted into the National Women's Hall of Fame in Seneca Falls, New York in 2011. In 2014, she was recognized by the Harry S Truman Library and Museum with the Harry S Truman Legacy of Leadership Award. In 2019, Shalala was announced as one of the members of the inaugural class of the Government Hall of Fame.

Shalala has been awarded more than 50 honorary degrees.

See also 
List of female United States Cabinet members
List of Arab and Middle Eastern Americans in the United States Congress
Women in the United States House of Representatives

Notes

References

External links 

President Donna E. Shalala Biography, University of Miami.
"America's Best Leaders: Q&A with Donna Shalala, President of the University of Miami, U.S. News & World Report, October 22, 2005.
President Donna E. Shalala Collection, 1980–1988, Hunter College Archives and Special Collections

|-

|-

|-

|-

|-

1941 births
Living people
20th-century American politicians
20th-century American women politicians
21st-century American politicians
21st-century American women politicians
American academic administrators
American corporate directors
American Federation of Teachers people
American political scientists
American politicians of Lebanese descent
American University alumni
American women in business
American women political scientists
Baruch College faculty
Clinton administration cabinet members
Clinton Foundation people
Columbia University faculty
Democratic Party members of the United States House of Representatives from Florida
Fellows of the United States National Academy of Public Administration
Female members of the United States House of Representatives
Leaders of the University of Wisconsin-Madison
Maxwell School of Citizenship and Public Affairs alumni
Members of the Inter-American Dialogue
Members of the National Academy of Medicine
Ohio Democrats
Peace Corps volunteers
Politicians from Cleveland
Presidential Medal of Freedom recipients
Presidents of Hunter College
Presidents of the University of Miami
United States Secretaries of Health and Human Services
University of Miami faculty
Western College for Women alumni
Women heads of universities and colleges
Women members of the Cabinet of the United States